Pełcznica may refer to:
Pełcznica, Lower Silesian Voivodeship, a village in south-western Poland
Pełcznica (river)